The Santa Claus Gang is a 2010 Italian comedy film directed by Paolo Genovese.

Plot
During Christmas Eve, Aldo, Giovanni and Giacomo are arrested for home burglary. As the three were dressed as Santa Claus, the police think they are the Santa Claus Gang, a group of wanted thieves. During the night, they narrate a small but significant portion of their lives during the interrogation, until the real Santa Claus Gang is caught.

Cast 
 Aldo Baglio as Aldo
 Giovanni Storti as Giovanni
 Giacomo Poretti as Giacomo
 Angela Finocchiaro as Irene Bestetti
 Giovanni Esposito as Benemerita
  as Elisa
  as Monica
 Antonia Liskova as Veronica
  as Marta
 Mara Maionchi as Giovanni's mother-in-law
 Giorgio Colangeli as Veronica's father
 Cochi Ponzoni as Terlizzi
 Massimo Popolizio as the junk dealer
 Remo Remotti as the tramp

Accolades

See also
 List of Christmas films

References

External links 

2010 comedy films
2010 films
Italian Christmas comedy films
Films directed by Paolo Genovese
2010s Italian-language films
2010s Christmas comedy films
2010s Italian films